Aladjem is a surname. Notable people with the surname include:

 Mackenzie Aladjem (born 2001), American actress
 Mirit I. Aladjem, Israeli-American biologist

See also
 Aladje